The railway from Savenay to Landerneau is an important French 245-kilometre long railway line. It is used for passenger (express, regional and suburban) and freight traffic. The railway was opened in several stages between 1862 and 1867.

Route

Traffic
TGV
TER Bretagne
TER Pays de la Loire

Main stations
 Savenay station
 Redon station
 Vannes station
 Auray station
 Lorient station
 Quimper station
 Landerneau station

Line history

The section between Savenay and Lorient was opened in 1862
 Lorient – Quimper: 1863
 Quimper – Châteaulin: 1864
 Châteaulin – Landerneau: 1867

References

Railway lines in Brittany
Railway lines in Pays de la Loire